The  Koepelgevangenis is a former prison in Haarlem, Netherlands. It is one of three Panopticon-style  buildings situated in the country. One of three designed by Willem Metzelaar, the building was completed in 1901. A Rijksmonument, the prison closed in 2016. After the prison's closure, the building, along with the one at Arnhem, was used to house asylum seekers to the Netherlands.

See also
Koepelgevangenis (Breda)

References

External links
Koepelgevangenis: cellengebouw in Haarlem at rijksmonumenten.nl (in Dutch)

Prisons in the Netherlands
Rijksmonuments in Haarlem